Holmes Middle School can refer to:

Holmes Middle School (Colorado Springs, Colorado)
Holmes Middle School (Livonia, Michigan)
Holmes Middle School (Fairfax County, Virginia)